The Primorsky Krai gubernatorial recall election were held on 16 December 2018. Election was scheduled after the cancellation of the results of the elections held in September.

Previous events

On 4 October 2017, Governor Vladimir Miklushevsky resigned, and Russian President Vladimir Putin appointed Andrey Tarasenko as Acting Governor.

Snap gubernatorial election were held on a Single Voting Day on 9 September 2018. In the first round of elections, none of the candidates was able to gain an absolute majority. To the second round, which was scheduled for 16 September, came the incumbent Acting Governor Andrey Tarasenko, nominated by the United Russia, and Andrey Ishchenko, nominated by the Communist Party.

The second round of election caused a wide public response due to the conflict situation that arose when counting the votes cast for the candidates in the second round. In the process of receiving the results from the polling stations all the time with a margin of about 5% was in the lead Ishchenko (up to 95% of the processing protocols), but after processing more than 99% of the protocols was that more votes Tarasenko. After that, the headquarters of both candidates accused each other of violations, and mass protests began.

On 19 September, the Central Election Commission recommended invalidating the election results. According to the law, new election must be held no later than 16 December.

On 26 September, President Vladimir Putin appointed Oleg Kozhemyako as Acting Governor instead of Andrey Tarasenko, who has filed a statement of resignation.

On 16 October, at an extraordinary meeting of the regional Legislative Assembly, the deputies appointed the date of the new election for 16 December 2018.

On 3 November, the Communist party stated it wouldn't nominate a candidate since Andrey Ishchenko "actually won" the September election after which official results were "forged" in favor of Andrey Tarasenko, and also due to problems with passing of the "municipal filter" (a collection of signatures of municipal deputies required to participate in the elections). Nevertheless, Andrey Ishchenko submitted documents for participation in elections to the Regional Election Commission as the independent candidate.

Candidates

Registered candidates
Initially, 5 candidates were registered to participate in the elections, but on 10 December one candidate withdrew, thus 4 candidates participate in the election.

Withdrawn candidates

Rejected candidates
Candidates running for Governor, but rejected by REC.

Other candidates who did not run
The individuals in this section have been the subject of speculation about their possible candidacy or expressed an interest in running for governor, but did not submit an application to the Regional Election Commission.
Alexey Kozitsky, Member of the Legislative Assembly of Primorsky Krai, September 2018 gubernatorial candidate.
Svetlana Goryacheva, Senator from Primorsky Krai.
Yulia Tolmacheva, Member of the Legislative Assembly of Primorsky Krai, September 2018 gubernatorial candidate.
Steven Seagal, actor and film producer. Segal said that he would like to become Governor of Primorsky Krai at the end of September, however, he could not become Governor, because, in addition to Russian citizenship, he also has American and Serbian citizenship (according to the Russian law, multiple citizenship prevents participation in elections). However, according to a poll conducted at the end of October, Steven Seagal would have been able to get up to 10% of the vote.

Opinion polls

Results

|- style="background-color:#E9E9E9;text-align:center;"
! style="text-align:left;" colspan=2| Candidate
! style="text-align:left;"| Party
! width="75"|Votes
! width="30"|%
|-
| style="background-color:;"|
| style="text-align:left;"| Oleg Kozhemyako
| style="text-align:left;"| Independent
| 
| 61.88
|-
| style="background-color:;"|
| style="text-align:left;"| Andrey Andreychenko
| style="text-align:left;"| Liberal Democratic Party
| 
| 25.16
|-
| style="background-color:;"|
| style="text-align:left;"| Alexey Timchenko
| style="text-align:left;"| Party of Growth
| 
| 5.17
|-
|bgcolor=#78a1d0|
| style="text-align:left;"| Roza Chemeris
| style="text-align:left;"| For Women of Russia
| 
| 3.80
|-
| style="text-align:left;" colspan="3"| Valid votes
| 
| 96.01
|-
| style="text-align:left;" colspan="3"| Blank ballots
| 
| 3.99
|- style="font-weight:bold"
| style="text-align:left;" colspan="3"| Total
| 
| 100.00
|-
| style="background-color:#E9E9E9;" colspan="6"|
|-
| style="text-align:left;" colspan="3"| Turnout
| 
|46.35
|-
| style="text-align:left;" colspan="3"| Registered voters
| 
| 100.00
|-
| style="background-color:#E9E9E9;" colspan="6"|
|-
| style="text-align:left;font-size:90%;" colspan="6"|Result
|}

References

Primorsky Krai, December
December 2018 events in Russia
Politics of Primorsky Krai